"Falling" is a song by industrial rock band Gravity Kills from the album Perversion, released by TVT Records in 1998.

Release
"Falling" reached No. 35 on Billboard's Mainstream Rock chart on July 4, 1998. 
The song was included in both original and instrumental form in the 1998 cross-platform racing video game Test Drive 5.

References

External links
 "Falling" on Allmusic

Gravity Kills songs
TVT Records singles
1998 singles